Laurajane Smith  (born 1962) is a Heritage and Museum Studies scholar. Among Smith's publications that examine the politics of heritage, she edited the book Uses of Heritage. She published the book Emotional Heritage: Visitor Engagement at Museums and Heritage Sites. In 2016, Smith was elected Fellow of the Academy of the Social Sciences in Australia.

References 

1962 births
Living people
Australian archaeologists
Academic staff of the Australian National University
Australian women archaeologists
Fellows of the Academy of the Social Sciences in Australia